Marcelo Santos de Melo Júnior (born 19 November 1987) is a Brazilian actor, singer-songwriter, and model.

Biography
Marcelo Melo Jr. was born in Nova Iguaçu, in the Baixada Fluminense, RJ, and grew up in the Vidigal slum, South Zone of Rio de Janeiro.

In an interview for the magazine "Quem" in 2012: "I came to live with my father in Vidigal to 7 years and saw the first show, in which he was part of the cast, and fell in love It is my first idol My childhood there. was really fun, I bucked kite was very kid, did theater, I had a lot of happiness and at the same time learning the responsibilities".

Career
Formed by the theater group "Nós do Morro", which is part since 1997. Marcello is also a singer, musician and composer of hip hop band, "Melanina Carioca".

In film, participated in the most successful productions of the resumption of Brazilian cinema as "Cidade de Deus" by Fernando Meirelles and "Última Parada 174", Bruno Barreto.

In theater he participated in numerous assemblies Group "Nós do Morro", among them prominently in "Os Dois Cavaleiros de Verona" directed by Guti Fraga. He worked on TV in the novels "Viver a Vida" worked on "A Lei e o Crime" directed by Alexandre Avancini, Rede Record series, and the same year was to Globo. In 2010, he joined the cast of the youth novel "Workout" with Maicon character.

Marcello joined the cast of the series "caRIOcas", which would be the first Brazilian gay series, but it was canceled. But some scenes were eventually released on the internet and YouTube.

The following year, he joined the cast of the six o'clock novela, "A Vida da Gente". Soon in 2012, he appeared in another six o'clock novela, "Lado a Lado", as Reed.

In 2014, he was cast in the soap opera of the nine, "Em Família", as the violent villain Jairo. And as early as July 27, 2014, the actor was announced in the cast of "Babilônia", scheduled to open after Carnival 2015. "Marcello's character is a physical education teacher, humorous, and has nothing to do with the marginality", said Ricardo Linhares, co-author of "Babilônia", next to Gilberto Braga and John Ximenes Braga. In November of that same year he was champion of the "Dança dos Famosos" framework.

In 2015 the actor became part of the cast of the new nine o'clock novela on Rede Globo, "Babilônia", playing "Ivan", a teacher of slackline.

Coleção Mjr.
Marcello Melo Jr. launches its own line of caps and shirts, in partnership with "Uniti Rio", the "Coleção Mjr." ("Collection Mjr.") The launch took place on August 28, 2014, in the "Top Fashion Bazar", in Barra da Tijuca in Rio de Janeiro.

Filmography

Discography
 Melanina Carioca (Marcello Melo Jr. is part of the hip hop group with seven members, including the actor Jonathan Haagensen and Roberta Rodrigues actress.)

Awards and nominations

References

External links
 
 

1987 births
Living people
People from Nova Iguaçu
Brazilian male television actors
Brazilian male film actors
21st-century Brazilian male singers
21st-century Brazilian singers
Brazilian male models
21st-century Brazilian male actors
Afro-Brazilian male singers